Pance F. Pondaag (February 18, 1951 – June 3, 2010) was an Indonesian pop singer and songwriter. The Jakarta Post described Pondaag as one of Indonesia's most famous pop singers during the 1980s.

Pondaag was born on February 18, 1951, in Makassar, South Sulawesi. Pance Pondaag died of a stroke at his home in Pluit, North Jakarta, at 5 p.m. on June 3, 2010, at the age of 59. He was from the Minahasa and Sangirese ethnic groups of North Sulawesi but also had partial ethnic Chinese ancestry.

References

External links
Pance F Pondaag Dies at 59 

1951 births
2010 deaths
Bugis people
20th-century Indonesian male singers
Indonesian pop singers
Indonesian songwriters
Indonesian people of Chinese descent
People of Sangirese descent
Minahasa people
People from Jakarta
People from Makassar
Indonesian Roman Catholics
Indonesian Christians